This is a list of actors who appeared on the American soap opera Loving.

Cast

Loving